The Central African Republic (CAR) observes a single time zone year-round, denoted as West Africa Time (WAT; UTC+01:00).

IANA time zone database 
In the IANA time zone database, the Central African Republic is given one zone in the file zone.tab—Africa/Bangui. "CF" refers to the country's ISO 3166-1 alpha-2 country code. Data for the Central African Republic directly from zone.tab of the IANA time zone database; columns marked with * are the columns from zone.tab itself:

See also 
Time in Africa
List of time zones by country

References

External links 
Current time in the Central African Republic at Time.is
Time in the Central African Republic at TimeAndDate.com

Time in the Central African Republic